Table tennis men's singles at the 2022 Commonwealth Games is held at the National Exhibition Centre at Birmingham, England from 3 to 8 August 2022.

Seeds 
The seeds for the tournament were:

  (quarterfinals)
  (final, Silver medalist)
  (Semi-finals, Bronze medalist)
  (champion, Gold medalist)
  (round of 16)
  (Semi-finals, Fourth place)
  (quarterfinals)
  (round of 16)

  (round of 16)
  (round of 16)
  (round of 16)
  (round of 16)
   (round of 32)
  (quarterfinals)
  (quarterfinals)
  (round of 16)

Main draw

Finals

Top half

Section 1

Section 2

Bottom half

Section 3

Section 4

Preliminary stage

Group 1

Group 2

Group 3

Group 4

Group 5

Group 6

Group 7

Group 8

Group 9

Group 10

Group 11

Group 12

Group 13

Group 14

Group 15

References

External links 
 Table Tennis results at Commonwealth Games Birmingham 2022 website – Select Filter by Event - Men's Singles

Men's singles